State Route 141 (SR 141) is a route from U.S. Route 1 (US 1) and SR 3 in Belfast to SR 139 in Monroe. The route's entire length is in Waldo County.

Junction list

References

External links

Floodgap Roadgap's RoadsAroundME: Maine State Route 141

141
Transportation in Waldo County, Maine